Pyanda is a rural locality (a settlement) in Vinogradovsky District, Arkhangelsk Oblast, Russia. The population was 446 as of 2010. There are 9 streets in Pyanda.

Geography 
Pyanda is located on the Severnaya Dvina River, 17 km northwest of Bereznik (the district's administrative centre) by road. Ustye is the nearest rural locality.

References 

Rural localities in Vinogradovsky District